Tianjin Modern City Office Tower is a supertall skyscraper in Tianjin, China. It was first proposed in 2010. Construction began in 2011 and ended in 2016. The secondary tower is used primarily as a hotel and luxury apartments.

See also
List of tallest buildings in China

References

Skyscraper office buildings in Tianjin
Buildings and structures under construction in China